Apamea inebriata, the drunk apamea, is a moth of the family Noctuidae. It is found along the east coast of North America from Nova Scotia to North Carolina.

This species is not well known. The population of this moth has a disjunct distribution made up of scattered local occurrences, mainly in coastal regions. It is common in some areas, and quite uncommon in others. It inhabits wetlands but has been found in drier habitat types.

The moth is streaked with yellow, reddish brown, black, and gray, making it cryptic when resting on dead wood. The forewings are 15 to 19 millimeters long.

References

Further reading
Ferguson, D. C. (1977). A new North American species of Apamea formerly confused with Apamea verbascoides (Guenee) (Noctuidae). Journal of the Lepidopterists' Society 31.

Apamea (moth)
Moths described in 1977
Moths of North America